Frederick High School may refer to:
Frederick High School (Colorado), Frederick, Colorado
Frederick High School (Maryland), Frederick, Maryland
Frederic High School, Frederic, Wisconsin